Silk Performer is a software performance testing tool across web, mobile and enterprise applications. It was originally developed by Segue Software which was acquired by Borland in 2006. Borland was acquired by Micro Focus International in 2009.

Silk Performer ensures that applications and server up times are maintained when faced with peak customer usage. Silk Performer allows identification of such problems using integrated diagnostics and trending reports.

Description

Silk Performer supports major Web 2.0 environments like Adobe’s Flash/Flex, Microsoft Silverlight, and HTML/AJAX. 
Silk Performer also supports load testing Web applications at the protocol level (HTTP).

Silk Performer helps predict and prevent outages to future-proof business performance. Supports mobile web devices and cloud computing generation load through cloud technologies.

References

External links
 
 Data sheet

Software testing tools
Load testing tools
Micro Focus International